Roberto Pinheiro da Rosa (born 3 June 1998), simply known as Roberto, is a Brazilian footballer who plays as a defender for Avaí.

Professional career
Roberto joined the youth academy of Internacional in 2014. Roberto made his professional debut with Internacional in a 1-0 Campeonato Gaúcho win over Esporte Clube São Luiz on 20 January 2019. On 3 March 2019, Roberto signed a 3 year contract with Internacional until 2022.

References

External links
 
 Roberto at playmakerstats.com (English version of ogol.com.br)
 Internacional Profile

Living people
1998 births
Footballers from Porto Alegre
Brazilian footballers
Association football defenders
Campeonato Brasileiro Série A players
Campeonato Brasileiro Série B players
Sport Club Internacional players
Paraná Clube players
Avaí FC players